Nguyễn Kim Thiềng (born 30 October 1960) is a Vietnamese wrestler. He competed in the men's freestyle 52 kg at the 1980 Summer Olympics.

References

External links
 

1960 births
Living people
Vietnamese male sport wrestlers
Olympic wrestlers of Vietnam
Wrestlers at the 1980 Summer Olympics
Place of birth missing (living people)